Rajiv Rathore (born 20 May 1962) is an Indian first-class cricketer who represented Rajasthan. He made his first-class debut for Rajasthan in the 1985-86 Ranji Trophy on 20 December 1985.

References

External links
 

1968 births
Living people
Indian cricketers
Rajasthan cricketers